ROTH BART BARON (ロット・バルト・バロン) is a Tokyo-based musical project formed in 2008 with Masaya Mifune (vocal, guitar) and Tetsuya Nakahara (drums) but is currently a solo project headed by Mifune. The band has released three EPs and six full-length albums along with one live album. The group also composed and recorded the soundtrack for the Japanese film "My Small Land".

Biography 
Masaya Mifune and Tetsuya Nakahara met in junior high school when they were partnered up to play tennis doubles. They started the band in university and, in the beginning, spent most of the time rehearsing and home recording. The band's name, ROTH BART BARON, comes from the antagonist von Rothbart in Tchaikovsky's The Swan Lake. Mifune played the role in kindergarten which left a strong impression on him being the only antagonist at that time.

The band self-released three works including the EP "ROTH BART BARON"(2010), the five-track EP "Monster Mountain and Choirboys" (13 December 2012) and "Chocolate Demo" (21 September 2012). Songs from these early works, especially those in "Monster Mountain and Choirboys" are still often performed on shows.

ROTH BART BARON signed to Felicity and released their first full album ROTH BART BARON's THE ICE AGE in 2014. The album was recorded in Philadelphia with Jonathan Low and Brian McTear.

A second album, ATOM. was released in 2015. The recording was done at Hotel2Tango in Montreal. The music video for the lead track, "bIg HOPe" was filmed with 360/ VR cameras.

In 2017, Roth Bart Barons started a crowdfunding project on Campfire for EP and music video production in UK. With the success of the funding, the band took a short stay in London and worked with Bradley Spence for the EP.

The "Atom (UK Mix)" video, as part of the project, was filmed near Brighton with the German photographer Julia Schönstädt.

On July 6th, 2020, Masaya and Tetsuya announced that Tetsuya would be leaving the band.

In 2022, Mifune Masaya of ROTH BART BARON was featured on the song "You to You" by Asian Kung-Fu Generation which later appeared on Asian Kung-Fu Generation's album Planet Folks.

Live Performances

Tours 
ROTH BART BARON'S THE ICE AGE release tour 2014
ROTH BART BARON'S THE ICE AGE release tour in North America 2014
ATOM Tour 2015~2016 in Japan
ASIA TOUR 2016 (18 June, Shanghai; 19 June, Beijing; 26 June, Gachuurt, 28 June, Taipei)
HEX TOUR 2018-2019 in Japan
The Name of the Beast TOUR 2019-2020 in Japan and Taiwan
Loud Color(s)& Silence Festival TOUR 2020-2021 in Japan
HAKU's Resurrection TOUR 2021-2022 in Japan
HOWL TOUR 2022-2023 in Japan

Festivals 
Summer Sonic 2015 
Big Mountain Music Festival 2015
Play Time Festival 2016 
Fuji Rock Festival '16 
Rising Sun Rock Festival in Ezo '17

Members 
Mifune Masaya (三船雅也) - vocal, writer, guitar, bass, piano, electronics

Discography

Albums

EPs

Demos

References 

Musical groups from Tokyo